The earliest definite mention of cricket is dated Monday, 17 January 1597 (i.e., a Julian date which is 1598 by modern reckoning under the Gregorian calendar). The reference is in the records of a legal case at Guildford re the use of a parcel of land c.1550 and John Derrick, a coroner, testified that he had at that time played cricket on the land when he was a boy. Cricket may have been a children's game in the 16th century but, about 1610, the earliest known organised match was played and references from that time indicate adult participation. From then to 1725, less than thirty matches are known to have been organised between recognised teams. Similarly, a limited number of players, teams and venues of the period have been recorded.

Having originated in England sometime before c.1550, cricket's introduction to other lands began in the seventeenth century, reaching India for example by the early eighteenth century. The earliest matches played by English parish teams are examples of village cricket. Although village matches are now considered minor in status, the early matches are significant in cricket's history simply because they are known. There were no newspaper reports of matches until the end of the seventeenth century and so the primary sources are court records and private diaries, hence games were rarely recorded.

In the course of the seventeenth century, cricket in London and the south-eastern counties of England evolved into a popular sport, staging lucrative eleven-a-side matches featuring the earliest professional players. The information is subject to change in the light of ongoing research.

Known organised matches (1611–1725)
The table below is fully chronological. It summarises all of the 27 known organised matches from 1611 to 1725 and does not separate matches by form or status. It therefore includes examples of both "important" and "minor" matches, bearing in mind that some minor matches are historically significant. Unless specified as such, "impromptu" games amongst friends, practice matches, etc. are excluded. Although single wicket was in vogue at the time, the earliest definite record of a single wicket match is in 1726.

Other events
1597
The earliest definite mention of cricket is in the records of a legal case at Guildford, concerning ownership of a parcel of land, and confirms that the sport was played there by schoolboys c. 1550.

1611
The match at Chevening is tentatively dated c. 1611 and it is in the records of that year that two definite and key references are found. First, a French-English dictionary was published by Randle Cotgrave who defined the noun crosse as "the crooked staff wherewith boys play at cricket". The verb form of the word is crosser, defined as "to play at cricket".

Secondly, although cricket was defined as a boys' game in Cotgrave's dictionary, as per the Guildford schoolboys in the sixteenth century, it was at this time that adult participation is known to have begun. The first definite mention of cricket in Sussex was also in 1611 and relates to ecclesiastical court records stating that two parishioners of Sidlesham in West Sussex had failed to attend church on Easter Sunday because they were playing cricket. They were fined 12 pence each and made to do penance.

1613
Another court case recorded that someone was assaulted with a "cricket staffe" at Wanborough, near Guildford.

1617
Oliver Cromwell, then aged 18, went to London and trained for a time at one of the Inns of Court. William Dugdale later recorded that Cromwell played cricket and football there. This is the earliest known reference to cricket in London.

1620
Introduction of Gunter's chain. The pitch has been 22 yards long (i.e., a chain) since the first known code of laws in 1744. It is believed this length had been in use since the introduction of Gunter's chain.

It is believed that the over consisted of four deliveries from time immemorial until the 19th century.

1622
Several parishioners of Boxgrove, near Chichester in West Sussex, were prosecuted for playing cricket in a churchyard on Sunday, 5 May. The record of this case at Boxgrove contains the earliest reference to the cricket bat.

1628
An ecclesiastical case related to a game at East Lavant, near Chichester, being played on a Sunday.

1629
Henry Cuffin, a curate at Ruckinge in Kent, was prosecuted by an Archdeacon's Court for playing cricket on Sunday evening after prayers. He claimed that several of his fellow players were "persons of repute and fashion". This statement is the first evidence of cricket achieving popularity among the gentry.

1636
In a court case concerning a tithe dispute, a witness called Henry Mabbinck testified that he played cricket "in the Parke" at West Horsley in Surrey.

1637
Another ecclesiastical case recorded parishioners of Midhurst, West Sussex, playing cricket during evening prayer on Sunday, 26 February.

1640
Puritan clerics at both Maidstone and Harbledown, near Canterbury, denounced cricket as "profane", especially if played on Sunday.

1646
The earliest reference to gambling on a cricket match is in the records of a court case concerning non-payment of a wager that was made on a game at Coxheath in Kent on 29 May that year.

1647
A Latin poem contains a probable reference to cricket being played at Winchester College; if so, it is the earliest known mention of cricket in Hampshire. There are few 17th century references to cricket being played at or in the vicinity of schools but it was noted at Eton and Winchester by the time of the Commonwealth. A comment by Horace Walpole confirms that cricket was being played at Eton during the first quarter of the 18th century.

1652
A case at Cranbrook against John Rabson, Esq. and others referred to "a certain unlawful game called cricket". Rabson was evidently a member of the gentry but the other defendants were all working class.

1654
Three men were prosecuted at Eltham in Kent for playing cricket on a Sunday. Oliver Cromwell's Protectorate had been established the previous year, but the defendants were charged with "breaking the Sabbath", not with playing cricket. There is no evidence that cricket, unlike the theatres and other forms of entertainment, was banned by the Puritans.

1658
The earliest reference to the cricket ball is found in 1658 in Mysteries of Love and Eloquence by Edward Phillips.

1664
The Gaming Act 1664 was passed by the Cavalier Parliament to try to curb some of the post-Restoration excesses, including gambling on cricket, and it limited stakes to £100. That was equivalent to about £ in present-day terms. It is known that cricket could attract stakes of 50 guineas by 1697 and it was funded by gambling throughout the next century.

c.1665
There is a reference to the game at St Paul's School, London about this time concerning John Churchill, 1st Duke of Marlborough, who studied there.

1666
In May, Sir Robert Paston of Richmond wrote a letter to his wife mentioning "a game of criquett (sic) on Richmond Green" which is the first reference to cricket at Richmond Green, a popular venue for important matches during the 17th and 18th centuries.

1671
A man called Edward Bound was charged with playing cricket on the Sabbath and was exonerated: an indication that attitudes were changing in the wake of the Restoration. The case was reported in Shere, Surrey.

1673
Earliest reference to cricket at Oxford University.

1677
Accounts of Thomas Lennard, 1st Earl of Sussex, include an item which refers to £3 being paid to him when he went to a cricket match being played at "ye Dicker", which was a common near Herstmonceux in East Sussex.

1680
The earliest known reference to the wicket is contained in lines written in an old bible which invited "All you that do delight in Cricket, come to Marden, pitch your wickets". The wicket until the 1770s comprised two stumps and a single bail.

1685
Mitcham Cricket Club was formed, the club playing on what is today known as Mitcham Cricket Green. The site has hosted cricket matches ever since. Mitcham is believed to be the world's oldest cricket club as there is no evidence of any other club being founded before 1685. Croydon, Dartford and London had all been founded by the 1720s but their dates of origin have been lost, although there was an actual reference to a London Club in 1722.

1694
Accounts of Sir John Pelham record 2s 6d paid for a wager concerning a cricket match at Lewes.

1695
Parliament decided against a renewal of the 1662 Licensing Act and so cleared the way for a free press on the Act's expiry in 1696. It was from this time that cricket matters could be reported in the newspapers, but it would be a very long time before the newspaper industry adapted sufficiently to provide frequent, let alone comprehensive, reports.

1710
The earliest reference to cricket being played at Cambridge University.

1725
The Artillery Ground in Finsbury was first mentioned in cricketing terms when meeting minutes of the Honourable Artillery Company referred to "the abuse done to the herbage of the ground by the cricket players". London Cricket Club became chiefly associated with the venue through much of the 18th century.

First mentions
As illustrated by the table of matches above, little is known of organised cricket to 1725 and equally little of clubs and teams, players and venues. There is a shortage of references from the latter part of the 17th century due to the Licensing of the Press Act 1662 which imposed stringent controls on the newspaper industry and sport, including cricket, was not reported. The few surviving references have been found in official records, such as court cases, or in private letters and diaries.

The four bulleted lists below summarise the known participants to 1725 under each heading. The earliest important match that is designated inter-county was in 1709 and the traditional county soon became the key unit of organisation. Until 1725, only nine counties had been mentioned in connection with cricket and the earliest mention of each is summarised below. In addition, London has on occasion been equated in status with the counties of Middlesex and Surrey for cricketing purposes. All the counties are in the south-eastern quarter of the country. In a similar vein, although not always in association with one of the above matches, those players, venues, clubs and teams known to have been active or in use by 1725 are also listed.

Counties

The first definite mentions of cricket in the following traditional counties occurred between 1597 and 1724:
 Cambridgeshire – 1710 at the University of Cambridge
 Essex – 1724 re the Chingford-Stead match
 Hampshire – 1647 at Winchester College
 Kent – c.1611 re the match at Chevening 
 London – 1617 re Oliver Cromwell
 Middlesex – 1680; also the first mention re umpires
 Oxfordshire – 1673 at the University of Oxford
 Surrey – 1597 re John Derrick and the Guildford court case; the world's earliest definite mention of cricket
 Sussex – 1611 re an ecclesiastical court case

Clubs and teams

With the exception of Mitcham, club and team foundation dates cannot be determined, but it is known that the following clubs or teams were active during the period:
 1st Duke of Richmond's XI
 2nd Duke of Richmond's XI
 Arundel
 Chatham
 Chingford
 Croydon
 Dartford
 Edwin Stead's XI
 Kent (pre-county club)
 Kingston
 London
 Mitcham (1685)
 Penshurst, Tonbridge & Wadhurst
 Richmond
 Rochester Punch Club
 Sir William Gage's XI
 Sunbury
 Surrey (pre-county club)
 Tonbridge
 West Kent

Players
The contemporary sources rarely mentioned players by name but it is known that the following were active during the period:
 Charles Lennox, 1st Duke of Richmond (Sussex)
 William Bedle (Dartford and Kent)
 Edwin Stead (Kent)
 William Goodwin (Sunbury and Middlesex)
 Sir William Gage, 7th Baronet (Sussex)
 Charles Lennox, 2nd Duke of Richmond (Sussex)
 Edmund Chapman (Chertsey and Surrey)

Venues

The following venues are known to have been used during the period:
 Artillery Ground
 Bury Hill, Arundel
 Dartford Brent
 Duppas Hill
 Kennington Common
 Lamb's Conduit Field
 Mitcham Cricket Green
 Moulsey Hurst
 Penshurst Park
 White Conduit Fields

Footnotes

References

Bibliography

External links
 

Matches
Matches